David Regis (born 3 March 1964) is an English retired professional footballer who played as a striker. He scored 53 goals from 237 appearances in the Football League in the 1990s, notably for Stoke City and Notts County.

Playing career
Regis was born in Paddington, London. He began his playing career in non-league football with clubs including Dunstable Town, Fisher Athletic, Windsor & Eton and Barnet. Barnet sold him for a fee of £25,000 to Notts County, where he began his professional career at the age of 26.

He also played professionally for Plymouth Argyle, Bournemouth, Stoke City (two seasons), Birmingham City, Southend United, Barnsley (where he was a member of the squad promoted to the Premier League, making four appearances that season), Peterborough United, Leyton Orient, Lincoln City and Scunthorpe United, where he finished his professional career in 1998, having made 231 league appearances. He later returned to non-league football with Wivenhoe Town in Essex and Hucknall Town.

Post-playing career
Regis has been a football consultant and youth coach at Notts County's and Nottingham Forest's academies, education and welfare officer at Charlton Athletic's academy, and a regional manager in the Football League's youth development department.

Personal life
Regis is the younger brother of footballer Cyrille Regis, the cousin of sprinter John Regis, and the uncle of footballer Jason Roberts.

Career statistics

A.  The "Other" column includes appearances and goals in the Anglo-Italian Cup, Football League play-offs, Football League Trophy and Full Members Cup.

Honours
Notts County
 Second Division play-off winners: 1990–91

Stoke City
 Second Division champions: 1992–93

References

External links
 
 

1964 births
Living people
Footballers from Paddington
English footballers
Association football forwards
Dunstable Town F.C. players
Fisher Athletic F.C. players
Windsor & Eton F.C. players
Barnet F.C. players
Notts County F.C. players
Plymouth Argyle F.C. players
AFC Bournemouth players
Stoke City F.C. players
Birmingham City F.C. players
Southend United F.C. players
Barnsley F.C. players
Peterborough United F.C. players
Scunthorpe United F.C. players
Leyton Orient F.C. players
Lincoln City F.C. players
Wivenhoe Town F.C. players
English Football League players
National League (English football) players
Black British sportspeople
Hucknall Town F.C. players